John Pomeroy (1677-1725) was Archdeacon of Cork  from 1717 until his death.

The son of Arthur Pomeroy, Dean of Cork, he  was born in Cork and educated at Trinity College, Dublin. He held the living at Kilcully; and was Treasurer of Cork from 1710 to 1717.

References

Alumni of Trinity College Dublin
Archdeacons of Cork
Clergy from Cork (city)
18th-century Irish Anglican priests
1677 births
1725 deaths